Sportvereniging Broki is a football club located in the  neighbourhood of Paramaribo, Suriname. It competes in the SVB Eerste Divisie, the highest division of Surinamese football. The club's home ground is the Mgr. Aloysius Zichem Sportcentrum.

Broki won promotion to the first tier after finishing second in the 2017–18 SVB Tweede Divisie.

Honours

References

External links 
 S.V. Broki at Global Sports Archive

Football clubs in Paramaribo
Football clubs in Suriname